Ramupura is a village in the Bhiwani district of the Indian state of Haryana. , the village had 367 households with a population of 1,977 of which 1,056 were male and 921 female.

Temples 

Shiv Temple
Hanuman Temple 
Baba Takiya Temple

References

Villages in Bhiwani district